Livré-sur-Changeon is a commune in the Ille-et-Vilaine department of Brittany in north-western France.

Population
Inhabitants of Livré-sur-Changeon are called in French livréens.

See also
Communes of the Ille-et-Vilaine department

References

External links

Official website
Mayors of Ille-et-Vilaine Association 

Communes of Ille-et-Vilaine